Receptor-interacting serine/threonine-protein kinase 4 is an enzyme that in humans is encoded by the RIPK4 gene.

The protein encoded by this gene is a serine/threonine protein kinase that interacts with protein kinase C-delta. The encoded protein can also activate NFkappaB and is required for keratinocyte differentiation. This kinase undergoes autophosphorylation.

Interactions
RIPK4 has been shown to interact with PRKCB1.

References

Further reading

External links